Shockley Bluff is a very steep bluff forming the south end of Deception Plateau, overlooking the point where Pilot Glacier joins the larger Aviator Glacier, in Victoria Land. Mapped by United States Geological Survey (USGS) from surveys and U.S. Navy air photos, 1960–64. Named by Advisory Committee on Antarctic Names (US-ACAN) for Lieutenant Commander William E. Shockley, U.S. Navy, officer in charge of the Squadron VX-6 winter detachment at McMurdo Station, 1966.

Cliffs of Victoria Land
Borchgrevink Coast